Airliner World is an aviation magazine published by Key Publishing in Stamford, Lincolnshire, England. In the United States, the magazine is distributed from Key Publishing office in Avenel, New Jersey.

The first edition of Airliner World was published in May 1999  and is now the UK’s biggest selling monthly civil aviation magazine.

Airliner World is dedicated to airlines and airliners. The magazine publishes worldwide aviation news, as well as articles on regional and worldwide airports and airlines. Another airline publication, Air International, does not represent competition, since both magazines are published by Key publishing. Airliner World is part of a group of aviation magazines published by Key, including AIR International, Air Forces Monthly, and sister magazine, Airports of the World.

Contents
Each monthly issue of the magazine contains a host of feature articles, a list of the latest commercial aircraft deliveries, a report on air safety including a list of incidents and accidents, and twenty pages of headline "News Review", with separate sections, in order, on Europe, CIS, Africa/Middle East, Americas, Asia/Pacific, and News Review International. The magazine focuses predominantly on today's commercial aviation and often takes a retrospective look at airlines and airports or events. There is often a section for aircraft simulation review, recent books, DVDs and model aircraft, a section on aircraft spotting, all heavily illustrated.

Special features
As specials, the magazine often includes aircraft posters, calendars, airline guides, and airport guides. Occasionally, the magazine holds various contests. These contests have included writing captions, designing aircraft liveries, photography contests. Once in a while, the magazine will issue a supplement called Global Airline Guide, which contains information on all airliners of the world. The guide contains information about the airlines' fleets and an analysis of the marked. The supplement comes in two parts either in the July, August, or September issue. The various airport guides includes statistics, facts and figures.

Editorial staff

Editor
Craig West

Editor-at-large
Gordon Smith

Assistant editor
Thomas Lee

References

External links
Magazine's website
Key Publications' homepage

Aviation magazines
Monthly magazines published in the United Kingdom
Transport magazines published in the United Kingdom
Magazines established in 1999
1999 establishments in England
Mass media in Lincolnshire